Zhanggong may refer to these places in China:
 Zhanggong District (章贡区), a district of Ganzhou, Jiangxi

Towns
 Zhanggong, Henan (张弓), in Ningling County, Henan
 Zhanggong, Jinxian County (张公), in Jinxian County, Jiangxi
 Zhanggong, Sichuan (张公), in Yilong County, Sichuan

See also
Zhang Gong (born 1992), Chinese footballer